Big Giant Wave (lit. "Like a Wave") is a Canadian documentary film, directed by Marie-Julie Dallaire and released in 2021. The film is an homage to the power and influence of music, exploring the topic both through performance clips and interviews with various figures including singer-songwriter Patrick Watson, classical violinist Stéphane Tétreault and DJ Osunlade.

The film premiered on March 19, 2021, at the International Festival of Films on Art in Montreal, before being released commercially on April 2 in both English and French versions.

Awards

References

External links

2021 films
2021 documentary films
Canadian documentary films
Documentary films about music and musicians
Quebec films
French-language Canadian films
English-language Canadian films
2020s Canadian films
Best Documentary Film Jutra and Iris Award winners